Black and White is a 1932 Soviet animated short film directed by Ivan Ivanov-Vano and Leonid Amalrik.

Themes
The film addresses issues of racism in the Southern United States sugar industry. Themes of racial injustice, racial violence, working-class solidarity dominate the film. It depicts black men working in a field, walking in chains, sitting behind bars, and being executed in an electric chair. In most scenes, a white authority figure is seen whipping or guarding the men. The last image of the film is Vladimir Lenin's last name. The soundtrack of the film is the traditional Negro spiritual entitled "Sometimes I Feel like a Motherless Child".

Aesthetic approach

Stylistically the animated short, like many other European animated films, places emphasis the communication of ideas and messages; a direct contrast to the style favored by Disney, which sought to "create relatable characters with expressive personalities and attitudes."

See also
Russian animation
Soviet cinema

References

External links
 Blek end uayt IMDB page
 

1932 films
Soviet black-and-white films
Films directed by Ivan Ivanov-Vano
Soviet animated short films
Soviet propaganda films
1930s animated short films
1932 animated films